Gilles Labbé (born March 9, 1948) is a Quebec politician. He served as the member for Masson as a member of the Parti Québécois from 1998 until 2003.

Biography
Labbé was a team leader and socio-economic aid officer for the City of Montreal for almost 30 years.

Political career

Labbé served as a Le Gardeur municipal councillor from 1982 until 1994 and then became the mayor from 1994 until his election. He also served concurrently as Prefect of L'Assomption Regional County Municipality from 1996 until 1998.

Labbé was named as a replacement candidate for Yves Blais, who died of a heart attack eight days before the 1998 election, for the district of Masson, and won in an election that was postponed until 12 December of that year. He served as a backbench supporter in the Bouchard government and the Landry government, serving as Parliamentary assistant to the Minister of State for Administration and the Public Service and President of the Treasury board in the latter.

He did not seek re-election in 2003.

Electoral record

Provincial

References 

1948 births
Living people
French Quebecers
Mayors of places in Quebec
Parti Québécois MNAs
Politicians from Montreal
People from Repentigny, Quebec
Quebec municipal councillors
20th-century Canadian politicians
21st-century Canadian politicians